The cloven-feathered dove (Drepanoptila holosericea) is a species of bird in the family Columbidae. It is monotypic within the genus Drepanoptila, but this genus is possibly better merged into Ptilinopus.

It is considered near-threatened by the IUCN due to habitat degradation and hunting.

Distribution and Population 
Drepanoptila holosericea is endemic to the island of New Caledonia where it is commonly found in its forest habitat. It is also found south of New Caledonia all throughout Ile des Pins but not the Loyalty Islands. Research groups in 1998 have estimated that 140,000 total individual birds live throughout its total range.

Ecology 
The cloven-feathered dove is found commonly in primary and secondary moist forests up to 1,000 meters in elevation. It appears to prefer humid forests 400–600 meters in elevation, especially on the forest edge. However, there are little information of the bird's diet. All ornithologists have observed is that it does eat multiple different fruits and berries.

Threats 
This bird is sparsely hunted because of ammunition quotas, making hunters save their ammunition for larger targets. If these quotas are removed, the dove may be hunted more and could rapidly decline in population, even though this bird is protected by law. Other threats include forest fires, deforestation, and mining operations.

References

http://www.birdlife.org/datazone/species/factsheet/22691585 

cloven-feathered dove
Endemic birds of New Caledonia
cloven-feathered dove
Taxonomy articles created by Polbot